Sønsteby is a Norwegian surname. Notable people with the surname include:

 Gunnar Sønsteby (Gunnar Fridtjof Thurmann Sønsteby, 1918–2012), Norwegian World War II resistance fighter
 Sven Sønsteby (1933–2014), Norwegian illustrator

Norwegian-language surnames